Paul Wheeler may refer to:

 Paul Wheeler (footballer) (born 1965), Welsh footballer
 Paul Wheeler (writer), British screenwriter and novelist
 Paul Wheeler (rugby union) (born 1947), Welsh rugby union player